Magie may refer to:

Bob Magie Jr., American curler
Elizabeth Magie (1866–1948), American game designer
William Francis Magie (1858–1943), American physicist, a founder of the American Physical Society
Magie Dominic (born 1944), Canadian poet and artist from Corner Brook, Newfoundland and Labrador

See also